Mou Chung-yuan is a Taiwanese chemist. He was the Deputy Minister of the National Science Council (NSC) of the Executive Yuan in May 2012 until March 2014.

Career 
Mou earned a bachelor's degree from National Taiwan University in 1970 and pursued graduate study in the United States, completing his doctorate at the Washington University in St. Louis in 1975. Before assuming his role at the National Science Council, Mou was a professor of chemistry at the National Taiwan University. He was elected a member of The World Academy of Sciences in 2013, and the Academia Sinica in 2016.

References

Government ministers of Taiwan
Living people
1949 births
Taiwanese chemists
National Taiwan University alumni
Washington University in St. Louis alumni
Academic staff of the National Taiwan University
Members of Academia Sinica
20th-century Taiwanese scientists
TWAS fellows
21st-century Taiwanese scientists